In taekwondo, a weight class is a standardized weight range for taekwondo practitioners. The upper weight limit for each class is the maxiumum weight for that class. The minimum weight for each class must be above the maximum weight for the next lowest class. A taekwondo gyeorugi is usually scheduled for a fixed weight class, and each practitioner's weight must exceed the lower limit, and must not exceed the upper limit.

Senior weight classes
Most of the domestic / international taekwondo competitions for senior practitioners have traditionally consisted of 16 weight classes, eight for men and eight for women.

Olympic weight classes
Since the International Olympic Committee limits the total number of taekwondo entrants to 64 men and 64 women, there are only eight weight classes - four for each gender - at the Summer Olympics, and the Pan American Games as well.

See also

Brazilian Jiu-Jitsu weight classes
Boxing Weight Class
Kickboxing weight classes
Mixed martial arts weight classes
Professional wrestling weight classes
Wrestling weight classes

References

External links
 World Taekwondo official website
 Taekwondo from International Olympic Committee